Alexander Davis may refer to:

Alexander Davis (politician) (1833–1889), American politician
Alexander Jackson Davis (1803–1892), American architect
Alexander K. Davis, American politician